A Live Worship Experience is the fifth live album from Casting Crowns. Reunion Records alongside Beach Street Records released the album on November 13, 2015.

Critical reception

Signaling in a three star review by CCM Magazine, Matt Conner describes, "it’s a well-packaged set that will animate the faith of the listener." Mikayla Shriver, rating the album four stars from New Release Today, says, "Casting Crowns has delivered yet another spectacular album...and it's definitely worth hearing." Assigning the album three and a half stars by Worship Leader, Jeremy Armstrong describes, "the vulnerability and intimacy brought to their music...is largely due to Mark Hall's powerful delivery and authenticity in song...definitely a worthy addition to their already impressive catalogue of God-honoring music."

Tony Cummings, allocating the album a nine out of ten rating from Cross Rhythms, writes, "this live set maintains the group's highest standards and, who knows, may end up being another Platinum-selling project for the most consistent of worship teams." Awarding the album four stars at 365 Days of Inspiring Media, Joshua Andre states, "a stirring and motivational record". Herb Longs, giving the album four stars by The Christian Beat, writes, "Casting Crowns' talent in music, lyrics, and leadership creates an incredible atmosphere of worship for listeners." Rating the album a nine out of ten at Jesus Wired, Rebekah Joy says, "Casting Crowns has created another staple album for Christian music fans."

Track listing

Chart performance

References

2015 live albums
Reunion Records albums
Casting Crowns albums